Rogues and Romance is a surviving 1920 American silent drama film directed by George B. Seitz. The film was a feature-length version of the serial Pirate Gold, also directed by Seitz, and was shot in Europe. The film survives incomplete in the Library of Congress collection and George Eastman House Motion Picture Collection.

Cast
 June Caprice as Sylvia Lee
 George B. Seitz as Reginald Van Ransen
 Harry Semels as Pedro Pezet
 Marguerite Courtot as Carmelita
 William P. Burt as Don Jose
 Frank Redman as Bartholomew Washington Stump

References

External links

Rogues and Romance at SilentEra

1920 films
1920 romantic drama films
American silent feature films
American romantic drama films
Films directed by George B. Seitz
American black-and-white films
1920s American films
Silent romantic drama films
Silent American drama films